This is a list of agriculture gods and goddesses, gods whose tutelary specialty was agriculture, either of agriculture in general or of one or more specialties within the field.  Each god's culture or religion of origin is listed; a god revered in multiple contexts are listed with the one in which he originated.  Roman gods appear on a separate list.

 

 
Gods
Agricultural